The Council Grove Missouri, Kansas and Texas Depot is a former Missouri–Kansas–Texas Railroad (MKT) station at 512 E. Main Street in Council Grove, Kansas. The station opened in 1894 to replace the previous station, a utilitarian building which opened with the MKT line through Council Grove in 1869 and had burned down earlier in the year. The wooden building has a Victorian design that features ornamental siding and brackets along the roof. The station served both freight and passenger traffic; the former included cattle, local agricultural products, and American Express mail. Trains served the station until 1957, when the MKT ended service along the line through Council Grove. The station is one of eleven surviving MKT stations in Kansas, and it is the only one not to have been relocated.

The station was added to the National Register of Historic Places on October 11, 2001.

References

		
National Register of Historic Places in Morris County, Kansas
Railway stations on the National Register of Historic Places in Kansas
Railway stations opened in 1894
Former Missouri–Kansas–Texas Railroad stations
Victorian architecture in Kansas